Mohammadiyeh-e Sofla (also Romanized as Moḩammadīyeh-e Soflá; also known as Maigaf, Maigāf Pāīn, Mīgof, Moḩammad Gab, Moḩammad Gap-e Pā’īn, Moḩammad Gap-e Soflá, and Mohammad Kab Sofla) is a village in Shaban Rural District, in the Central District of Nahavand County, Hamadan Province, Iran. At the 2006 census, its population was 72, in 17 families.

References 

Populated places in Nahavand County